Roslyn Mickelson is a professor of sociology at the University of North Carolina at Charlotte and has written several books dealing with the effects of school desegregation. She had served as an expert witness in numerous court cases.

Roslyn Arlin Mickelson was born in Ottawa, Ontario on April 3, 1948. She was raised in Los Angeles, earning her PhD at the University of California, Los Angeles in 1984. She then moved to Charlotte, North Carolina and began her teaching career at the University of North Carolina at Charlotte. Her research is in the political economy of schooling and school reform, focusing on the relationships among race and gender and the educational outcomes of those relationships.

In 1997 William Capacchione's daughter was denied enrollment in a magnet school in Charlotte. The Capacchione family filed suit against the Charlotte Mecklenburg Board of Education siting racial discrimination. Mickelson served as an expert witness for the school board, testifying that the girl had been denied enrollment as a result of established guidelines and not because of race. The case went all the way to the Supreme Court, who declined to hear it. The US Appeal Courts ruling was upheld and the School Board won.

Mickelson wrote Yesterday, Today and Tomorrow: School Desegregation and Re-segregation in Charlotte which analyzes the forces that have created the trend towards re-segregating public schools. The book focuses primarily on North Carolina and Charlotte schools.

She is Research Advisory Panel member for the National Coalition on School Diversity.

References

External links 
 Roslyn A Mickelson Papers, J Murrey Atkins Library, UNC Charlotte
 Rosyn Mickelson Interview

1948 births
Living people
American sociologists
American women sociologists
University of North Carolina at Charlotte faculty
People from Ottawa
People from Charlotte, North Carolina
University of California, Los Angeles alumni
21st-century American women